Kristen K. Waggoner (born 1972) is an American constitutional lawyer. She was the lead counsel in a case at the United States Supreme Court concerning First Amendment rights, Masterpiece Cakeshop v. Colorado Civil Rights Commission. In the lawsuit, Waggoner represented Masterpiece Cakeshop owner Jack Phillips. She currently serves as CEO, President and General Counsel of the Christian-oriented legal organization Alliance Defending Freedom (ADF).

Early life and education 

Waggoner was born in 1972 in Longview, Washington, which is about an hour outside of Portland. Her father is Clint Behrends, a school superintendent and a licensed minister in the Assemblies of God denomination. Her mother, Lavonne Behrends, is a stay-at-home mom. Lavonne also worked part-time in the accounting industry. Waggoner is the eldest of four children.

For primary school through law school, Waggoner attended Christian schools.  Her father was the principal during her 1st through 12th grades. In an interview with The Daily Signal, Waggoner relates the life changing story of how she became motivated to become an attorney. When she was 13 she attended a summer camp. While at the camp she prayed and "saw clearly that defending ministries and religious freedom should be her path." She said, "That’s what I thought God was impressing on me to do, and it matched with my skill set." In high school she played volleyball and basketball. She graduated high school as valedictorian.

She attended Northwest University on a drama scholarship. Northwest is also a Christian school and is affiliated with Assemblies of God. She excelled in debate and public speaking, and continued playing volleyball. After graduating magna cum laude from Northwest, she attended Regent University School of Law. At Regent she won "best oralist" at the Whittier Moot Court Competition, a national contest. She graduated in 1997 with a Juris Doctor cum laude.

Career 

After law school, Waggoner was a law clerk to Justice Richard B. Sanders of the Washington Supreme Court. She then interned with U.S. Representative Linda Smith. In 1998, she entered private practice with the Seattle law firm Ellis, Li & McKinstry (ELM). ELM specializes in constitutional law and many of its clients are religious organizations. According to partner Keith Kemper, it's "perhaps the nation’s largest private law firm made up of Christian attorneys." Waggoner was elevated to partner in 2004.

Waggoner's most important case while at ELM was the Arlene's Flowers Lawsuit. In 2013 florist Barronelle Stutzman declined to provide flowers for a same sex wedding based on her deeply held Christian beliefs. Same sex marriage was legalized in Washington in 2012. The case went all the way to the Washington State Supreme Court where Waggoner argued the case based on First Amendment grounds. The court decided against Stutzman to which Waggoner responded: The case was submitted to the United States Supreme Court for review. On June 25, 2018, the U.S. Supreme Court granted the petition for a writ of certiorari, vacated the judgment, and remanded the case to the Supreme Court of Washington for further consideration in light of the Masterpiece Cakeshop decision. On June 6, 2019, the Washington Supreme Court unanimously ruled against Stutzman again, finding no evidence of religious animus.  Stutzman's attorneys once again requested the U.S. Supreme Court to take her case, but certiorari was denied in July 2021.

Stutzman opted to settle with Ingersoll in November 2021, paying him , as she was getting close to retirement and wanted to stop accumulating legal fees related to the case. While she had filed a petition for rehearing in September 2021 to the Supreme Court, she withdrew it following the settlement.

Waggoner joined ADF in 2013 and moved to the firm's Scottsdale headquarters in 2014. Two cases--Arlene's Flowers and United States v. Windsor—provided the impetus to join the firm. She said: "The right of conscience is critical to the existence of the country and is the first freedom that our other civil liberties are directly connected with. I wanted to be a part of that—that fight to preserve it for my children and my grandchildren." In her capacity as General Counsel  Waggoner's duties include oversight of the U.S. Legal Division and Communications, which includes over 100 attorneys and staff who engage in litigation, public advocacy, and legislative support, as well as oversight of a nationwide network of 3,214 allied lawyers. During her tenure ADF has been victorious as lead counsel in nine Supreme Court cases, including Masterpiece Cakeshop v. Colorado Civil Rights Commission.

Michael Farris, Presidnt and CEO of ADF, said this about selecting Waggoner to argue the high-profile case Masterpiece Cakeshop: "She is exceedingly bright, winsome, the best communicator I’ve ever met in my life." The case arose from a dispute between Jack Phillips, a baker, and a gay couple wherein Phillips refused to bake a cake for their same-sex marriage ceremony due to his deeply held religious beliefs. Constitutional questions arising from the potentially precedent-setting case concerned the First Amendment rights of free speech and free exercise of religion. The Court took oral arguments on December 5, 2017. Regarding her presentation, David A. French of National Review wrote: "[Waggoner] strongly and clearly made the most vital point — the issue was the artistic message, not the identity of the customer." In 2018, Phillips prevailed in a 7–2 ruling.

On October 1, 2022, Waggoner succeeded Michael Farris as CEO and President of ADF, retaining her role as General Counsel.

Personal life 

Waggoner is married to fellow attorney Benjamin Waggoner, who also graduated from Regent Law School in 1997. The couple has three children. The faith tradition to which she belongs is Protestant. One of her favorite places is Disneyland, owing to fond childhood memories. Her office is adorned with Disney memorabilia and her phone ringtone is set to "Zip-a-Dee-Doo-Dah." She is a Pentecostal.

References

External links 
 Audio recording and transcript of Masterpiece Cakeshop oral arguments at C-SPAN
 

1972 births
American Pentecostals
Northwest University (United States) alumni
Regent University School of Law alumni
Living people